Num banhchok are lightly-fermented Cambodian rice noodles and a breakfast noodle dish. There are many regional variations of num banhchok across the country.

Preparation 

The num banhchok are made by soaking the rice for 2–4 hours and grinding them into a liquidy paste. The paste is pressed into round shapes and dried inside calico bags. Then it is pulverized and turned into a viscous paste, which is extruded into boiling water. The noodles are boiled for 3–4 minutes and transferred to cold water.

In folklore 

Num banhchok is featured in a popular Khmer folk legend about an influential revolutionary and scholar Thonchey. Thonchey was exiled to China by the Khmer king, where Thonchey began making num banhchok as a way to make a living. The dish quickly gained popularity among the Chinese and eventually attracted even the attention of the Chinese emperor. The emperor summoned Thonchey to bring num banhchok to his palace. Thonchey arrived and while the emperor was tasting the dish Thonchey managed to see the emperor's face, insulted him and was immediately thrown into jail. Soon Thonchey managed to get released and returned to the Khmer Empire.

In politics 

In May 2019 the National Police began detaining former members and supporters of the dissolved Cambodia National Rescue Party (CNRP) for attending noodle dinners that were deemed as political gatherings. In response co-founder of the CNRP Sam Rainsy called all Cambodians to gather for a bowl of num banhchok on 9 June "for the sake of friendship in the framework of the entire, giant Cambodian family."

His calls were soon followed by the Prime Minister Hun Sen who appealed to the members of his Cambodian People's Party to also gather the same day and eat "Khmer noodles of unity and solidarity", but denied it being a step towards negotiations with the opposition. It was estimated by Sen that from 7 to 8 million people would take part in the eating of num banhchok on 9 June.

Sen also proposed launching a promotional campaign for Cambodian food and culture, and two months later Ministry of Tourism and Ministry of Culture and Fine Arts began preparing an application for the inclusion of num banhchok in the UNESCO Intangible Cultural Heritage Lists.

References

External links 

 Mai, Jerry (4 February 2021). Fish curry vermicelli noodle soup (num banh chok). Asia Unplated. SBS
 Roney, Tyler (23 January 2019). Siem Reap: Making Num Banh Chok with Park Hyatt’s Executive Chef. Remote Lands
 The history of num banh chok (Cambodian rice noodles)

Cambodian soups
Vegetable dishes
National dishes